Thumbelina's One Night Stand is Melissa McClelland's third album. The album was released in 2006 in Canada by the Orange Record Label.

Performers
Melissa McClelland: vocals, backup vocals, guitars
Luke Doucet: guitars, vibes, wurlitizers, rhodes, backup vocals, piano, pedal steel, percussion, pump organ, harmonica
Rick May: electric and acoustic bass guitars, chamberlain, melotron, vibes, organ
Paul Brennan: drums and percussion
Janine Stoll, Lisa Winn, Katie McClelland, Chris Sheenan-Dyck: backing vocals

Track listing
"Passenger 24"
"Iroquois Street Factory"
"Solitary Life"
"A Price To Pay"
"You Know I Love You Baby"
"The Taxi Ride"
"Intermission"
"Go Down Matthew"
"Goodbye To You"
"Skyway Bridge"
"Come Home, Suzie"
"Dayton, Ohio 1903"
"Oh, Love!"
"Whisper (Jeff Trott mix)" - Bonus Track
"You Know I Love You Baby (Jeff Trott mix)" - Bonus Track
"Outro"

All songs written by Melissa McClelland, except Track 15 (by Ali Bartlett) and Track 12 (by Randy Newman)
Chloe Doucet-Winkelman performs vocals on "Oh Love!"
Greg Keelor performs vocals on "Skyway Bridge"
Sarah McLachlan performs vocals on "Go Down Matthew"

2006 albums
Melissa McClelland albums